Jueves negro (English: "Black Thursday") was a violent series of political demonstrations that created havoc in Guatemala City on 24 and 25 July 2003.

In May 2003, the Guatemalan Republican Front (FRG) political party selected former military dictator Efraín Ríos Montt as its candidate for the forthcoming November general election. However, his candidacy was initially rejected by the electoral registry and by two lower courts, on the grounds of a constitutional ban preventing former coup leaders from seeking the presidency (Ríos Montt had originally come to power by means of a coup d'état on 23 March 1982). On 14 July 2003, the Constitutional Court, which had had several judges appointed from the FRG, approved his candidacy for president, arguing that the terms of the 1985 Constitution could not be applied retroactively. 

On 20 July, however, the Supreme Court suspended his campaign for the presidency and agreed to hear a complaint brought by two right-of-centre parties that the general was constitutionally barred from running for president of the country. Ríos Montt denounced the ruling as judicial manipulation and, in a radio address, called on his followers to take to the streets to protest against this decision. On 24 July, the day known as 'jueves negro', thousands of masked FRG supporters invaded the streets of Guatemala City, armed with machetes, clubs and guns. They had been bussed in from all over the country by the FRG amidst claims that people working in FRG-controlled municipalities were being blackmailed with being sacked if they did not attend the demonstration. The demonstrators blocked traffic, chanted threatening slogans, and waved their machetes about.

They were led by well known FRG militants, including a well known member of Congress, who was photographed by the press early in the morning while co-ordinating the actions, and the secretary of Ríos Montt's daughter, Zury. The demonstrators marched on the courts, the opposition parties' headquarters, and newspapers, torching buildings, shooting out windows and burning cars and tyres in the streets. A TV journalist, Héctor Ramírez, intervened to try to save a colleague who was being attacked by the demonstrators and died of a heart attack while running away from the mob. The situation was so chaotic over the weekend that both the UN mission and the U.S. embassy were closed.

Following the rioting, the Constitutional Court, packed with allies of Ríos Montt and his protégé, President Alfonso Portillo, overturned the Supreme Court decision, upholding Ríos Montt's claim that the ban on coup leaders, formalized in the 1985 Constitution, could not be applied retroactively to acts before that date. Many Guatemalans expressed anger over the Court's decision.

Aftermath
Gen. Ríos Montt went on to be placed third in the November presidential vote, behind Álvaro Colom and Óscar Berger. 

Criminal charges were brought against seven FRG members for their role in inciting the riot and the manslaughter of Ramírez: Gen. Ríos Montt himself; Ingrid Elaine Argueta Sosa, his niece; Waleska Sánchez Velásquez, the secretary of Zury Ríos Montt; Jorge Arévalo, a congressional deputy; and Raúl Manchamé Leiva, a former director of the national police.  All were placed under house arrest. The charges against Gen. Ríos Montt were dismissed in January 2006.

In a related case, Carlos Ríos and four other members of the FRG were sentenced to three-year prison terms for racial discrimination (Guatemala's first such prosecution) for having levelled ethnic slurs at Nobel Peace Prize winner Rigoberta Menchú during a later challenge lodged with the Constitutional Court.  By paying stiffer fines in accordance with Guatemalan law, however, the five were able to escape serving jail time.

Narrative of events (BBC News coverage) 
25 May 2003:  Guatemala coup leader to stand (elected by party delegates)
8 June 2003:  Guatemala coup leader defies ban (registration rejected by electoral authorities)
6 July 2003:  Election setback for Guatemala general (Supreme Court rejects appeal, upholds June ruling by Supreme Electoral Tribunal)
15 July 2003: Guatemala general can seek office (Constitutional Court allows him to run, ruling that the Constitution can't be applied retroactively)
21 July 2003: Guatemala general blocked again (suspension by the Supreme Court, following appeal lodged by opposition parties)
24 July 2003: Bar on Guatemala general upheld (Constitutional Court upholds Supreme Court's suspension)
25 July 2003: Guatemala City hit by riot (Black Thursday)
31 July 2003: General to run in Guatemala (Constitutional Court overturns earlier ban)
11 November 2003: Guatemala general 'accepts loss' (Ríos Montt places third in first-round ballot)
9 March 2005 Guatemala Maya racism trial opens (Guatemala's first race discrimination trial)
 5 April 2005 Guatemala politicians were racist (five Guatemalan politicians have been found guilty of racial discrimination)

External links
Political Violence in Guatemala (ZNet)
Aggression, Beating, Hostage-Taking, Death Threats, Network in Solidarity with the People of Guatemala
Diputados y funcionarios del partido oficial involucrados en ataque de turbas a la capital (Prensa Libre report from 27 July 2003)

Conflicts in 2003
History of Guatemala
2003 in Guatemala
Terrorism in Guatemala
Racism
2003 riots